You Take the Kids is an American sitcom television series that aired on CBS from December 15, 1990, to January 12, 1991. The series starred Nell Carter, who also performed the theme song "Nobody's Got It Easy". You Take the Kids, which was perceived as being the black answer to Roseanne due to its portrayal of a working-class African-American family, featured Carter as a crass, no-nonsense mother and wife.

Synopsis
Carter stars as Nell Kirkland, the opinionated matriarch of a blue collar African American family living in Pittsburgh, Pennsylvania. Nell's husband Michael (Roger E. Mosley) worked as a school bus driver while Nell gave piano lessons at the family home for extra money. Nell and Michael had four children: eldest son Raymond (Dante Beze), boy-crazy daughter Lorette (Caryn Ward), 12-year-old Peter (Marlon Taylor), and 10-year-old Nate (Trent Cameron). In addition to the kids, Nell and Michael also had to contend with Nell's equally opinionated mother Helen (Leila Danette), who lived in the basement.

Cast
Nell Carter as Nell Kirkland
Roger E. Mosley as Michael Kirkland
Dante Beze as Raymond Kirkland
Caryn Ward as Lorette Kirkland
Marlon Taylor as Peter Kirkland
Trent Cameron as Nate Kirkland
Leila Danette as Helen

Production
The series was scheduled on Saturdays at 8pm (EST). It was canceled after six episodes (five were aired, but the sixth was pre-empted by CBS' special coverage of the Gulf War).

You Take the Kids was executive produced by Paul Haggis. The series was produced by CBS Entertainment Productions, MTM Enterprises and Paul Haggis Productions, and is currently distributed by CBS Television Distribution.

Episodes

References

External links
 

1990 American television series debuts
1991 American television series endings
1990s American sitcoms
1990s American black sitcoms
Television series created by Paul Haggis
CBS original programming
English-language television shows
Television shows set in Pittsburgh
Television series by CBS Studios
Television series by MTM Enterprises